Martin John Herrmann (January 10, 1893 in Oldenburg, Indiana – September 11, 1956 in Cincinnati) was a pitcher in Major League Baseball. He pitched in one game for the Brooklyn Robins during the  baseball season, working one scoreless inning on July 10.

His grandson, catcher Ed Herrmann, had a much longer professional career in the 1970s.

External links

1893 births
1956 deaths
Baseball players from Indiana
Major League Baseball pitchers
Brooklyn Robins players